Otto Hulett (February 27, 1898 – September 1, 1983) was an American film, television and stage actor.

Hulett was born in Chicago, Illinois. As an actor, he was best known for his roles in The Mob (1951), Saturday's Hero (1951), and Carbine Williams (1952).

He died in Katonah, New York.

Partial filmography
 One Third of a Nation (1939)
 The Mob (1951)
 Her First Romance (1951)
 Saturday's Hero (1951)
 You for Me (1952)
 Carbine Williams (1952)
 Sally and Saint Anne (1952)
 Paula (1952)
 Francis Goes to West Point (1952)
 City That Never Sleeps (1953)
 Ambush at Tomahawk Gap (1953)
 The Phenix City Story (1955), as Hugh A. Bentley
 Reprisal! (1956)
 Four Boys and a Gun (1957)

Partial theatre
Personal Appearance (1934)
Born Yesterday (1946)

References

External links
 

1898 births
1983 deaths
American male film actors
American male stage actors
Male actors from Kansas
People from Salina, Kansas
20th-century American male actors